Who Was That Stranger is the thirty-eighth solo studio album by American country music singer-songwriter Loretta Lynn. It was released on May 24, 1988, by MCA Records. This was Lynn's first album to be issued on CD at the time of its release.

Track listing

Personnel 
Paul Anastasio – fiddle
Eddie Bayers – drums
Mike Caldwell – harmonica
Béla Fleck – banjo
Bill Hullett – dobro, acoustic guitar
David Hungate – bass guitar
Loretta Lynn – lead vocals, background vocals
Weldon Myrick – steel guitar
Peggy Sue – background vocals
Matt Rollings – piano
Billy Joe Walker Jr. – acoustic guitar
Curtis Young – background vocals
Reggie Young – electric guitar

Chart positions 
Album – Billboard (North America)

Singles – Billboard (North America)

References 

1988 albums
Loretta Lynn albums
MCA Records albums
Albums produced by Jimmy Bowen